Qingtang station, is a station of Line 9 of the Guangzhou Metro. It started operations on 30 June 2018, 6 months after the opening of the line.

Station layout

Exits

References 

Guangzhou Metro stations in Huadu District
Railway stations in China opened in 2018